Tianzhu County is a county in eastern Guizhou province, China, bordering Hunan province to the north, east, and southeast. It is under the administration of the Qiandongnan Miao and Dong Autonomous Prefecture.

Climate

References

County-level divisions of Guizhou
Counties of Qiandongnan Prefecture